The 1812 New Hampshire gubernatorial election was held on Tuesday March 10, .

Incumbent Governor John Langdon did not run for re-election.

Democratic-Republican candidate William Plumer 
defeated Federalist candidate and Former Governor of New Hampshire John Taylor Gilman.

Since no candidate received a majority in the popular vote, Plumer was elected by the New Hampshire General Court per the state constitution.

General election

Candidates
John Taylor Gilman, Federalist, former Governor
William Plumer, Democratic-Republican, former U.S. Senator, former President of the New Hampshire Senate

Results

Legislative election
As no candidate received a majority of the vote, the New Hampshire General Court was required to decide the election, both Houses in convention choosing among the top two vote-getters, Gilman and Plumer. The legislative election was held on June 4, 1812.

Notes

References

1812
New Hampshire
Gubernatorial